Denaverine is an antispasmodic drug. It was developed in Germany and patented in 1974. Denaverine  hydrochloride is used in veterinary medicine under the trade name Sensiblex as a muscle relaxant for the myometrium of cows and dogs during parturition. Under the trade name Spasmalgan, it has also been used in humans for the treatment of urogenital and gastrointestinal spasms.

Mechanism of action
Denaverine, like papaverine, acts as a phosphodiesterase inhibitor. Additionally, it has anticholinergic effects.

References

Antispasmodics
Dimethylamino compounds
Carboxylate esters
Ethers